Sagrado is a comune (municipality) in the Province of Gorizia in the Italian region Friuli-Venezia Giulia, located about  northwest of Trieste and about  southwest of Gorizia, on the left bank of the Isonzo River.

Sagrado is nearby the Monte San Michele, the seat of fierce fightings between Italy and Austria-Hungary during World War I.

Transport
Sagrado railway station is served by trains to Trieste, Udine, Treviso and Venice.

Twin towns
 Branik, Slovenia
 Győrság, Hungary
 Poggersdorf, Austria

References

Cities and towns in Friuli-Venezia Giulia